The Seventh Company Outdoors is a 1977 French comedy film directed by Robert Lamoureux. It is a sequel to Now Where Did the 7th Company Get to?.

Cast 
 Jean Lefebvre - Pithivier
 Pierre Mondy - Chaudard
 Henri Guybet - Tassin
  - Suzanne Chaudard
 Gérard Hérold - Le commandant Gilles
 Gérard Jugnot - Gorgeton
 Jean Carmet - M. Albert, le passeur
 André Pousse - Lambert
 Michel Berto

References

External links 

1977 comedy films
1977 films
French comedy films
Military humor in film
French World War II films
French war comedy films
1970s war comedy films
1970s French films